Altyn Asyr Closed Joint Stock Company (Turkmen: , means "Golden Age") is the state owned mobile operator in Turkmenistan. The company uses the TM CELL brand. In September 2013, it was the leader in the market with more than 3.5 million subscribers. It is headquartered in Ashgabat.

The company was founded through official decree by Turkmenistan leader Saparmurat Niyazov in 2004.

The company has a monopoly in the mobile market in Turkmenistan. The company is run by Shyhmyrat Shaharliyev, a member of Turkmenistan dictator Serdar Berdimuhamedov's family. The shareholders of the company are not publicly disclosed. Telecommunications are closely monitored and censored in Turkmenistan. Despite considerable investment by Turkmen authoritarian regime into the company, the services provided by the company have been described as poor.

History 
The company was established in August 2004. In the same year, the company became a member of the GSMA, where it was registered under the number 438 02. The operator became a structural unit of the Turkmentelecom which in turn is fully owned by the Ministry of Communications (Turkmenistan).

The equipment for the initial 50,000 subscribers was supplied by Siemens.  Equipment for 25 thousand numbers has been installed in Ashgabat (including Archabil District), Ahal Region (Ak Bugday, Ruhabat, Geoktepe Districts) and Abadan. The rest of the equipment with a total capacity of 25 thousand numbers was installed in the regional centers of Turkmenistan.

In 2010, Altyn Asyr was the first in Turkmenistan to launch a 3G network of the UMTS standard. In April 2010, the number of abonents of Altyn Asyr reached 500 thousand.

A new administrative building was inaugurated in October 2012. The four storey building accommodates 350 staff members.

Since 2012, the company has been providing international roaming services in foreign countries.

On September 18, 2013 the operator launched LTE. At the end of September 2014, the company introduced VoLTE.

Altyn Asyr's main competitor in Turkmenistan are Ashgabat City Telephone Network.

Operations 
Altyn Asyr in Turkmenisatn is a mobile network operator providing services under the standards GSM, 3G and LTE. Apart from cellular network, the company also offers local telephone service, broadband, mobile television.

Subscriber numbers 
Altyn Asyr has 5 network codes: 61, 62, 63, 64, 65. Telephone numbers in the international format are +99361xxxxxx, +99362xxxxxx, +99363xxxxxx, +99364xxxxxx, +99365xxxxxx.

Subscribers benefit from core services (voice communications, data transfer, SMS, MMS, voice mail, etc.)

Number of subscribers

Sponsorship 
The operator Altyn Asyr is a shirt sponsor of the football club Altyn Asyr FK since its inception. TM CELL name located on the front of the team's shirts.

References

External links 
 
 

Telecommunications companies of Turkmenistan